Gaina is a Romanian surname. Notable people with the surname include:

Carmen Gaina, geoscientist (Plate reconstruction), Geological Survey of Norway
Silvestru Gaina, philosopher at the University of Czernowitz
Valery Gaina (born 1956), rock musician
Vasile Gaina, theologian, professor, rector of Chernivtsi University

Găină 
 Andrei Găină, a Bessarabian politician

Romanian-language surnames